The Cole Bros. Circus was a medium-sized American circus. It was founded in 1884 as "W.W. Cole’s New Colossal Shows", by William Washington Cole. In the 1930s, the circus employed two noted animal trainers, Clyde Beatty and Allen King, both of whom traveled in their own railroad cars. During their shows the Cole Bros. Circus would often parade from their 35 large cars in the rail yards to where the circus was being performed. Another well-known performer with the circus was Bob Strehlau Juggles the Clown. In 1957 the show was renamed Clyde Beatty Cole Bros. Circus and bought by the Acme Circus Operating Corporation, an organization formed by Jerry Collins, Frank McColsky, Randolph Calhoun, and Walter Kernan.

As of 2014, Cole Bros. Circus was one of the few traditional circuses in the United States that remains under the Big Top tent. As of 2016 the show was essentially defunct, largely in response to animal rights activists advocating against the use of animals for live performances.

Alternative names 
 W.W. Cole’s New Colossal Shows
 Clyde Beatty Cole Bros. Circus - 1957
 Cole Bros. Circus 
Cole Bros. Circus Worlds Largest Circus Under The Big Top
Cole Bros. Circus Of The Stars

See also
 List of circuses and circus owners
 Clyde Beatty
 William Washington Cole

References

External links

 
Clyde Beatty and Cole Bros. Circus records, 1959, held by the Billy Rose Theatre Division, New York Public Library for the Performing Arts

Circuses